Scolia bicincta, the double-banded scoliid, is a species of scoliid wasp in the family Scoliidae.

It measures 21-25 mm. It is found in eastern and central North America. It is active in late summer.

References

External links

 

Scoliidae
Insects described in 1775
Taxa named by Johan Christian Fabricius